Paradise Found is a 2003 biographical film based on the life of Post-Impressionist painter Paul Gauguin. Starring Kiefer Sutherland as the title character, alongside Nastassja Kinski and Alun Armstrong.

Kiefer's father, Donald Sutherland, also plays Paul Gauguin in the 1986 film The Wolf at the Door.

Plot
The film covers a later part of Gauguin's life (Kiefer Sutherland) from 1880 to 1897, when he resigned his job as a stockbroker to paint full-time and journey to Polynesia. It documents how Gauguin befriended Pissarro, felt compelled to paint, abandoned his family and then chronicled his love of Tahitian life.

Cast
Kiefer Sutherland as Paul Gauguin
Nastassja Kinski as Mette Gauguin
Alun Armstrong as Camille Pissarro
Thomas Heinze as Schuff
Chris Haywood as Arnaud
Nicholas Hope as Maurrin
Marco Andreacchio as Juggler

Production
The film was filmed in Australia and the Czech Republic.

Box office
The film grossed $4,590 at the box office in Australia.

References

External links
 
 
 

2003 films
French biographical films
German biographical films
English-language French films
English-language German films
Biographical films about painters
Films shot in the Czech Republic
Films set in the 1880s
Films set in the 1890s
Films set in French Polynesia
Cultural depictions of Paul Gauguin
Films directed by Mario Andreacchio
2000s English-language films
2000s French films
2000s German films